Bill Cooke is a former American football coach. He served as the head football coach at his alma mater, Fort Lewis College in Durango, Colorado from 1984 to 1987 and at Missouri Southern State University on an interim basis in 1988 and full-time from 2000 to 2003, compiling a career college football coaching record of 35–49–1.

Head coaching record

References

Year of birth missing (living people)
Living people
Fort Lewis Skyhawks football coaches
Fort Lewis Skyhawks football players
Missouri Southern Lions football coaches